The 1889 World Allround Speed Skating Championships took place at 8 and 9 January at the ice rink Museumplein in Amsterdam, Netherlands. It is the first World Allround Speed Skating Championships, it's unofficial because there was no International Skating Union (ISU is founded in 1892)

Three distances were skated at the World Championship, the ½ mile (850 meter), the 1 mile (1609 meter) and the 2 miles (3219 meter). One became champion if one won all three distances.

The Russian Aleksandr Pansjin didn't win the final at the 2 miles and was not declared as winner due to the rules.

Allround results 

  * = Fell
 NC = Not classified
 NF = Not finished
 NS = Not started
 DQ = Disqualified
Source: SpeedSkatingStats.com

Rules 
Three distances have to be skated:
 ½ mile (805 m)
 1 mile (1609 m)
 2 miles (3219 m)

One could only win the World Championships by winning at all three distances, so there would be no World Champion if no skater won all three distances.

The winner of the distances was decided by a final of the best four skaters of the distance. If the same time was skated a skate-off is skated to decide the ranking.

Silver and bronze medals were not awarded.

References 

World Allround Speed Skating Championships, 1889
1889 World Allround
World Allround, 1889
World Allround Speed Skating Championships, 1889
January 1889 sports events
1889 in the Netherlands
19th century in Amsterdam
1889 in Dutch sport